The following is a list of currently operating public hospitals in Bosnia and Herzegovina.

Federation of Bosnia and Herzegovina

Clinical hospitals 
Clinical Center University of Sarajevo, Sarajevo 
Gynecology and Obstetrics Clinic of the Clinical Center University of Sarajevo (Jezero Maternity Hospital)
University Clinical Hospital Mostar, Mostar
University Clinical Center of Tuzla, Tuzla

County hospitals 
Dr. Irfan Ljubijankić Hospital, Bihać
Dr. Abdulah Nakaš General Hospital, Sarajevo
Fra Mato Nikolić Hospital, Nova Bila
Fra Mihovil Sučić Hospital, Livno
Goražde County Hospital, Goražde
Jajce Hospital, Jajce
Orašje County Hospital, Orašje
Dr. Safet Mujić Hospital, Mostar
Tešanj General Hospital, Tešanj
Travnik County Hospital, Travnik
Zenica County Hospital, Zenica
General Hospital Dr. Mustafa Beganović Gračanica, Gračanica
General Hospital Konjic. Konjic

Republika Srpska

Clinical hospitals
 University Clinical Center of the Republika Srpska, Banja Luka
 University Hospital Foča, Foča

General hospitals
 General Hospital "Saints Cosmas and Damian" Bijeljina, Bijeljina
 General Hospital "St. Luke the Evangelist" Doboj, Doboj
 General Hospital Gradiška, Gradiška
 General Hospital Istočno Sarajevo, Istočno Sarajevo
 General Hospital Nevesinje, Nevesinje
 General Hospital Prijedor, Prijedor
 General Hospital Trebinje, Trebinje
 General Hospital Zvornik, Zvornik

References 

Bosnia and Herzegovina

Hospitals
Bosnia and Herzegovina